Takiya Banwa Fakir is one of the state protected monument at Panchkula district in Haryana.

References

External links 
 

Monuments and memorials in Haryana
Panchkula district